The DC Comics' Earth One imprint features an extensive cast of characters which are re-imagined and modernized versions of the company's superheroes and supervillains from the DC Universe. Those characters include Superman, Batman, Wonder Woman, Green Lantern, and the Teen Titans, as well as others whose characteristics and origin stories are revised and altered to suit the 21st-century audience.

Superman: Earth One

Introduced in Volume One
 Kal-El / Clark Kent / Superman: Kal-El is the 20-year-old adoptive son of a childless couple from Smallville. His ship crash-landed in Kansas and was discovered by Jonathan and Martha Kent, who barely managed to escape the site before the military arrived and took custody of his ship. When Jonathan and Martha revealed to Clark that he came to Earth in a spaceship, and that he was an alien, Jonathan gave Clark a piece of metal from his ship. At some point in Clark's teenage years, Jonathan died. Arriving at Metropolis, he tries out several jobs: pro footballer, Major League baseball player, and positions in a scientific research company, and in financial services and media industries. His last job stop is at the Daily Planet newspaper. The metal piece of Clark's rocket, emits some kind of energy and Clark discovers Kryptonian symbols in the fragment's atoms. Just as this is happening, an invading alien force suddenly arrives and attacks Earth's major cities. After he stops the invasion, Clark returns to the Daily Planet, and presents Perry White an interview he wrote about the new hero. Amazed by Clark's story, Perry gives him a job as a reporter. Perry promotes Clark to write articles to help rebuild the newspaper's reputation. Lois is suspicious of Clark and the authenticity of his Superman article, so she decides to investigate his past. In Volume Two, a week later, Perry promotes Clark to write articles to help rebuild the Daily Planets reputation. Lois Lane is suspicious of Clark and the authenticity of his Superman article, so she decides to investigate his past. Clark later meets his neighbors Lisa Lasalle, whom he starts dating. Superman later goes head to head with the villain Parasite, whom he defeats with the help of warsuit, in which he can fight Parasite on equal terms. In Volume Three, Lois subsequently warns Superman that she learned from her uncle, a United Nations delegate, that the U.N is developing fail-safes against Superman. She later reveals that she has ceased her investigation because she now sees Clark is a decent person of good character, and not the type of person to fabricate a story. Superman later meets another super-powered being, named Zod-El, who says he is Superman's biological uncle. Zod claims that he has been searching for Kal-El ever since Krypton exploded. Superman later discovers that Zod not only intends to kill Superman but has convinced the world's governments that he is an enemy. After Zod's death, Superman announces that although he is disappointed that the United Nations aligned against him, it will not deter him from his mission to protect Earth. Seeing their fear, Superman asks Lois to be his political conscience.
 Tyrell: Tyrell is the genocidal leader of an alien armada from the planet Dheron, a neighboring world of the destroyed planet Krypton. He invades Earth and aims to kill Krypton's last survivor or to destroy most of humanity if he does not reveal himself. After killing millions of natives, his target finally revealed himself against him. Tyrell dies when he is impaled by a sharp piece of falling equipment after his battle with Clark. Before he dies, Tyrell warns Clark that other Dheronians will also try to find and eliminate him. He has some of the same powers as Clark under a yellow sun.
 Lois Lane: Lois Lane is the staff reporter of the Daily Planet. Clark Kent develops a crush on Lois at first sight and is impressed by her dedication and idealism towards her career during the Dheronians' invasion. Lois, along with Jim, also saves Clark when he, in his Superman persona, is trapped in Tyrell's gravity field. She later writes an editorial praising Superman's heroism during the crisis and eventually becomes his ally. She also currently has a yet-to-be-named boyfriend.
 James "Jim" Olsen: Jim Olsen is the staff photographer of the Daily Planet. Jim is known for his dedication to his job, deliberately putting himself in harm's way and risking life and limb for a perfect photograph. The photographs Jim has takes during the invasion have saved the Daily Planet from financial failure, and other news companies begin seeking reprint rights for Olsen's pictures.
 Perry White: Perry White is the editor-in-chief of the Daily Planet. White struggles to keep the once-great metropolitan newspaper running and refuse to give up. After the Dheronians' invasion and Superman's debut, the Daily Planets in-depth coverage from Lois, Jim, and Clark of the event has saved the newspaper and return to its former glory, and Perry is proud that the Daily Planet is back on top.
 Jonathan and Martha Kent: Jonathan and Martha Kent are Clark's adoptive parents who, despite their awareness of Clark's extraterrestrial origins, rescued him as an infant from the wreckage of his spaceship. Clark is especially close to his adoptive father, and was deeply affected when Jonathan died. Martha Kent is supportive towards her son, and has faith that Clark will choose the right path. She made Clark's Superman costume using the indestructible Kryptonian clothing Clark was wrapped in when they found him.
 Jor-El: Jor-El was the father of Clark and husband of Lara Lor-Van, as well as a high ranking scientist on Krypton, Jor-El was a member of the ancient and noble House of El, one of Krypton's five ruling families. Over the course of his life, he created many scientific wonders that brought peace and prosperity to all Kryptonians. Jor-El was one of the few members of the scientist caste who realized Krypton's ancient enemy, the Dheronians, had found a way to prevent the heat and pressure from Krypton's core from dissipating to the surface. Jor-El and his colleagues attempted to convince the ruling council of their findings, but by the time they were able to make their leaders believe them, it was already too late. Determined not to let his people's culture die, Jor and Lara, placed their infant son, Kal-El, into a prototype rocket Jor had built, etching lessons on Krypton's culture and history onto the very molecules of the ship. Jor and Lara launched the rocket just as Krypton began to explode, using the resulting energy shockwave to disguise the ship's energy signature from any Dheronian scanners. Jor's last moment with his wife was spent watching the rocket soar away toward a small out of the way planet orbiting a yellow star and populated by a race of beings indistinguishable in outward appearance from Kryptonians.
 Sandra Lee: Sandra Lee is a major in the US Army, scientist and a member of the Second Army Advanced Technology Division, a secret research facility where Clark's Kryptonian ship has been held and studied. Sandra has been tasked with finding out as much as possible about Superman and his origins. Sandra is skeptical of Superman's intentions and sees him as a potential threat to humanity, as the result she indirectly causes Alexander Luthor's death and puts his wife Alexandra into the path of villainy.

Introduced in Volume Two
 Raymond Jensen / Parasite: Raymond Jensen was a troubled youth who bullied his classmates and mutilated animals. During his adult years he would become a criminal who would do anything to get what he wanted. After an accident at S.T.A.R. Labs, he becomes a serial-killing metahuman with the ability to absorb energy and life force through physical contact and to convert that energy into health and power for himself. By absorbing Superman's life force, he gains his powers and renders the Man of Steel powerless. Later, the two fight once again, until Jensen's sister arrives, only to be unwillingly murdered by him, who then blamed her death on Superman. He was later defeated by Superman, arrested and is currently under the military's custody.
 Theresa Jensen: Theresa Jensen is Raymond's sister, who believes that her brother is a consultant with a real estate firm and is unaware of his status as a murderous criminal until his transformation. Raymond accidentally kills her when he embraces her, absorbing her vital energies. He blamed her death on Superman before the latter finally defeated him.
 Lisa Lasalle: Lisa Lasalle is Clark's neighbor and later becomes his love interest. Lisa is a former escort girl and currently she has begun a career as a model. In Volume Three, she spends much of her time with Clark, whom she later reveals she is in love with. She eventually discovers Clark's secret and supports his heroic endeavors. Lisa accompanied Clark to visit his mother in Smallville.
 Alexander and Alexandra Luthor: Alexander "Lex" Luthor has a genius intellect surpassing most people but has trouble relating to people. An inventor with degrees in many fields, specializing in particle physics, he married Alexandra, whom he calls "Alexa", a xenobiologist who had an intellect rivaling his own. The two started their own consulting firm, jokingly calling it "Lex-squared" after their common nickname. Major Lee recruits the wealthy couple of scientists, as independent contractors, to initially study Superman's ship, and later on find a way to neutralize Superman, in case he would pose a threat to national security. Alexander actively argues with his wife on the subject of researching ways to kill Superman, believing it is distasteful but Alexandra, who is the more aggressive of the two, sees it as an intellectual exercise. In Volume Three, the couple figures out that Superman is vulnerable to red solar radiation. During a battle between Superman and Zod, Alexander sacrifices himself helping Superman and succeeds to greatly weaken Zod with his red solar weapon. Alexandra, consumed by rage and grief, murders Zod but blames Superman for her husband's death. She then vows to dedicate her life to destroy him, and takes her husband's nickname Lex for her own. She subsequently places her husband's corpse in suspended animation and takes Zod's green Kryptonite from his ship.

Introduced in Volume Three
 Zod-El: Zod-El was a Kryptonian soldier, the brother of Jor-El and the one responsible for Krypton's destruction. Starting a coup d'état against the Science Council, Zod went behind his brother's help to no avail, starting a long and painful civil war that lasted six months until Zod's forces were on the run and Zod himself forced to flee Krypton to avoid arrest. On his defeat, Zod went towards Krypton's old enemy, the Dheronians, and gave them the means of finally destroy Krypton, and in return they will hunt any surviving Kryptonian and, should they fail, Zod will do it himself. He arrived Earth sometime after Tyrell's defeat at the hands of Superman. To gain Kal-El's trust, he purposely placed several lives at stake to stage the idea that he, too, arrived to help, immediately gaining the trust of his nephew. Luring Kal to a trap, he intended to use his longtime saved Kryptonite to finally kill him, but Superman outsmarted him and destroyed his protective Skin-Suit, forcing him to seal the Kryptonite while Kal escaped. Later when Zod was ready to kill Kal-El, Alexander Luthor shot him with his red solar weapon leaving him completely powerless but before that Zod was able to deliver a fatal stroke to Alexander. Being powerless, Zod was later killed by the revengeful wife of Alexander.
 Bill Lane: Bill Lane is Lois Lane's uncle, an U.N. delegate who is initially against Superman.

Batman: Earth One

Introduced in Volume One
 Bruce Wayne / Batman: Bruce Wayne is the eight-year-old son of Dr. Thomas Wayne, a mayoral candidate for Gotham City, and Martha Wayne (née Arkham). During an outing with his parents, Bruce is taken hostage by a mugger. He demands that the Waynes pay a ransom for the return of their son and as Thomas tries to intervene and the criminal shoots them both in front of Bruce. As a teenager, Bruce befriends his classmate, Jessica Dent, and develops a rivalry with her twin brother, Harvey Dent. He also learns about Arkham Manor, where his mother lived as a child. Bruce later convinces his guardian Alfred to train him in various forms of martial arts and acrobatics. Bruce also learns investigative techniques. Following this training, he discovers evidence that Mayor Oswald Cobblepot was involved in his parents' assassination. In his mid-twenties, Bruce dons a bat-themed costume as a disguise, inspired by his pre-training experience at Wayne Manor. Following an altercation between Cobblepot's bodyguards and Bruce at a function organized by the mayor, Bruce's alter ego is named "Batman" by the press and the topic becomes a public sensation. In a subsequent confrontation between Batman and Cobblepot, the mayor reveals that he intended to murder the Waynes, but the couple ran into the mugger instead. Cobblepot then prepares to kill an unmasked Bruce but is fatally shot by Alfred. Bruce is left disappointed by the truth behind his parents' death, but with Alfred's encouragement, decides that he will continue on to refine his new persona as Batman. In Volume Two, six months later, after losing track of one of the drug dealers he fought during a car chase, Wayne had Lucius Fox to build him a custom-made race car. A mysterious serial killer who calls himself "The Riddler", is murdering people in Gotham, hoping to get Batman's attention. Seeing Gordon's excellence as a detective, Batman asks Gordon to train him in forensics and deduction. Bruce is later accused of being the Riddler after the real one frames him in an attempt to divert James Gordon's investigation, but Jessica Dent, who knows about Bruce's double identity, is able to provide Bruce an alibi so he is not arrested. After chasing the Riddler, Batman subdues the killer. After he is cleared of all charges, Bruce generously writes a check to help the city's police department rebuild their precinct.
 Alfred Pennyworth: Alfred Pennyworth is a former soldier of the Royal Marines and a skilled martial artist and sharpshooter. He has a daughter living in Seoul, South Korea with her mother, where Alfred had previously worked at a security firm. In the military, Alfred lost a leg in an explosion. After Thomas Wayne saved his life following the explosion, he helps create a prosthetic leg to replace the one that Alfred lost, leaving Alfred indebted to Thomas's generosity. After his friend's murder, Alfred become Bruce Wayne's legal guardian and trains him in martial arts. Alfred's experiences with violence and the conditions in Gotham have caused him to develop a pessimistic and cynical view towards the world and people in general, though Bruce seems to have restored his faith a little. Alfred kills Cobblepot, shooting him in the chest, when the villain unmasks Batman.
 James Gordon: James Gordon was an idealistic cop but the mysterious death of his wife has left him disillusioned. He tries to protect his daughter from the crime-ridden Gotham City. Faced with his new partner, Harvey Bullock, and the subsequent emergence of the vigilante dubbed as Batman, Gordon's own principles are ultimately revived, and sets to once again become the moral and just policeman he once was to fight the corruption of Gotham. In Volume Two, Gordon is promoted as police captain after he arrests his predecessor Christopher Black; Black is exposed as one of Oswald Cobblepott's lieutenants. Gordon begins a secret alliance with Batman to get rid of the corruption within his department.
 Barbara Gordon / Batgirl: Barbara Gordon is a 17-year-old library assistant and daughter of James Gordon, who lost her mother at an early age. Taking on a supportive role for her increasingly disillusioned father, Barbara is soon captured by Mayor Cobblepot's henchman, the Birthday Boy. Her rescue by Batman then inspires her to consider a role in vigilantism and starts designing a costume of her own based on his. As of Volume Two, she is enrolled in University of California, Berkeley, majoring in computer science. Despite her relocation, she hacks into the city's mainframes for her father to help him find the Riddler and his targets.
 Lucius Fox: Lucius Fox is a young but brilliant intern at Wayne Medical, who wishes to develop a cybernetic prosthetic for his niece, who has lost her arm in an accident. After helping repair and even perfected Bruce Wayne's grapnel, he deduces that the young billionaire is the vigilante Batman after witnessing him using the same device on the news. At the end of the story, Lucius has come to accept his new role as a silent equipment developer for Batman, preparing a set of Batarangs for use. In Volume Two, he is promoted as the head of Wayne Enterprises' Research and Development division, provides Wayne a new Batsuit and additional tools and is tasked to build the Batmobile.
 Harvey Bullock: Harvey Bullock is a decent yet arrogant police detective from the Los Angeles Police Department, and the host of the cancelled reality show "Hollywood Detectives". Bullock requests to transfer to Gotham to look for the chance to revive his fame. He works together with his unwilling partner, James Gordon, at first to attempt to solve the Waynes' cold case murder, then to rescue James' daughter Barbara from the serial killer, the Birthday Boy. It is strongly implied that Harvey takes up drinking as a coping mechanism after witnessing the travesties that occurred in Arkham House, the Birthday Boy's dwelling.
 Oswald Cobblepot: Oswald Cobblepot was the mayoral competition for Dr. Thomas Wayne. Cobblepot holds a grudge against the Wayne family, believing the Waynes have disgraced the Cobblepot legacy. He planned for the Waynes to be murdered, but was not ultimately responsible for their death. He is the current, corrupt mayor of Gotham City, whom Batman fights against. When Batman confronts him, he sticks Batman with a trick stiletto from his umbrella then he removes Batman's cowl, finding out that Batman is Bruce Wayne. Fortunately, Alfred arrives on the scene and empties two barrels into Cobblepot's chest. The blast sent Cobblepot's body out of the window where he landed into the street below. After his death, his crimes were finally outed to the public.
 Harvey Dent: Harvey Dent along with his twin sister Jessica were friends with young Bruce Wayne from preparatory school, though Harvey had a rather antagonistic relationship with him. In his adult years, Harvey becomes Gotham City's District Attorney. After taking office, he and Jessica were known for investigating Mayor Oswald Cobblepot due to rumors of his illicit activities. In Volume Two, Harvey is later murdered by former Cobblepot henchman, Sal Maroni, during a prison riot, having a molotov cocktail smashed into his face after being stabbed in the back with a knife. Seconds before he dies, his grieving sister puts the left side of her own face onto his, burning her. After the incident, it is implied she has developed a dissociative identity disorder; half of the personality she refined is based on her late brother's.
 Jessica Dent: Jessica Dent is the twin sister of Harvey Dent and the president of the city's board of supervisors, Jessica has been Bruce Wayne's friend since they were teenagers; each harbors romantic feelings for each other since childhood despite Jessica's brother's disapproval. She is well known in the city for her ongoing feud with Mayor Oswald Cobblepot, and assumes the role of Mayor following Cobblepot's death. In Volume Two, she disfigures the left side of her face after her brother's death, and implied to have developed a dissociative identity disorder; half of the personality she refined is based on her late brother's.
 Thomas Wayne: Thomas Wayne was a physician who had run for mayor against Oswald Cobblepot, who had attempted to arrange his opponent's murder during the latter's outing to a movie with his wfe Martha and his Bruce, but a mugger got to them first and killed Thomas and Martha.
 Martha Arkham-Wayne: Martha Arkham-Wayne was the wife of Thomas Wayne and mother of Bruce Wayne. Her maiden name was Arkham instead of Kane in this alternate continuity. Martha's father was murdered by her mother when she was twelve, leaving her family with a series of scandals, including a rumor that the Arkham bloodline is peremptorily insane. Martha was a campaign manager of her husband's mayoral campaign against Oswald Cobblepot, who had planned to have a corrupt cop, Jacob Weaver, murder Thomas, but a mugger got to her family first and killed both her and her husband, leaving Bruce orphaned.
 Jacob Weaver: Jacob Weaver was once a corrupt police detective of Gotham City Police Department, but he quit the force to work for Cobblepot. He was partly responsible for the murders of Thomas and Martha Wayne at the behest of Cobblepot, who originally intended to have the Waynes kidnapped. He was killed by one of Cobblepot's henchmen.
 Ray Salinger / Birthday Boy: Ray Salinger is a serial killer known as "The Birthday Boy", who had escaped from Crane Institute under Cobblepot's arrangements. Salinger has a murderous fixation with his first victim, the 15-year-old debutante Amanda Grant. He refers to all his victims as "Amanda" and he commits the murders by abducting girls, taking them to a "playroom" in the abandoned Arkham Manor, where he gives them a birthday cake. After urging them to "make a wish", the Birthday Boy disembowels them with a butcher's knife and disposing their bodies in the manor's basement. One of his victims was Barbara Gordon but Batman was able to save her. The Birthday Boy is also the first costumed criminal that Batman encounters.
 Christopher Black: Gotham City Police Department's police captain, is a minor character appears in Volume One. As in Volume Two, he is discovered to be corrupt and was as one of Cobblepotts’ lieutenants. Gordon ultimately arrests Black and he succeeds him as captain.
 Axe: Axe is a drug dealer who works for Oswald Cobblepot, Axe finds pleasure in intimidating honest police officers like James Gordon. He is eventually beaten and arrested after the introduction of Gordon's new partner, Harvey Bullock.
 Crispus Allen: Crispus Allen is a detective from the Gotham City Police Department and partner to Renee Montoya.
 Renee Montoya: Renee Montoya is a detective from the Gotham City Police Department and partner to Crispus Allen.

Introduced in Volume Two
 Riddler: The Riddler is a serial killer who is obsessed with riddles and targets Batman, attempting to learn his secret identity to satiate his curiosity. In Volume Two, it is revealed that he once worked as Oswald Cobblepot's lieutenants, and is targeting his fellow members, staging a coup to take over Cobblepot's criminal empire. He starts murdering people in Gotham, hoping to get Batman's attention. Using discovered clues, Batman deduces that these killings were not random. Bruce Wayne is later accused of being the Riddler after the real Riddler frames him in an attempt to divert James Gordon's investigation. He was subsequently arrested by the Gotham City Police Department alongside Maroni, and brought up on 43 charges of murder.
 Waylon Jones / Killer Croc: Waylon Jones is a social outcast with a severe Ichthyosis condition, who is forced to hide in Gotham's sewers and is befriended by Batman. Due to his genetic deformity, his mother sold him to Haley's Circus whom its owner have him filed his teeth and billing him as the "Reptile Boy". Waylon soon escaped from the circus when it was passing through Gotham City. He helped Batman in capturing the Riddler but was wounded in the process. In gratitude, Batman offered Waylon a place at Wayne Manor. Jones is also tasked in finding a safe house for his benefactor.
 Sal Maroni: Sal Maroni is a former henchman of Oswald Cobblepot. Following Cobblepot's death and the wake of a police investigation into his criminal enterprise, Maroni was arrested and placed into a hearing by District Attorney Harvey Dent to reveal any information regarding to Cobblepot's remaining criminal associates. Maroni was interned at the police precinct but soon became the target of the Riddler, who is eliminating the people involved in Cobblepot's criminal network. Riddler allowed to release Maroni and many other inmates from their cells, in which Maroni took the opportunity to have his vengeance on Harvey Dent by stabbing him and then hitting his face with a Molotov cocktail, which fatally wounded Dent. Thereafter Maroni was re-arrested and charged for Dent's murder.
 Selina Kyle / Catwoman: Selina Kyle appears and helps Batman, tending his wounds after he falls in her apartment, while chasing the Riddler. She introduces herself as a single mother to Batman, during the time they spent together. Batman later discovers that she is neither the apartment's tenant or a mother, but a cat burglar who was robbing the building at the time.
 Jack Drake: Jack Drake was one of the lieutenants of Mayor Oswald Cobblepot before his death but he is later targeted and killed by the Riddler.

Introduced in Volume Three
 Adrian Arkham: Adrian Arkham is Bruce's maternal grandfather. The character is introduced in Volume Three.
 Clayface
 Winslow Schott / Toyman
 Dick Grayson / Robin
 Rory Regan / Ragman
 Joker

Teen Titans: Earth One

Introduced in Volume One
 Victor "Vic" Stone / Cyborg: Victor Stone is a boy who was given elements from Starfire's ship. His body is slowly being covered with liquid metal. After being brought to the S.T.A.R. Labs branch in Utah, the metal connected to Starfire's ship creates a mecha suit, which he names Rover. He's in a relationship with Tara. S.T.A.R. Labs gave him the codename Cyborg.
 Garfield Mark "Gar" Logan / Changeling: Gar Logan is a freshman who jumped two grades. He has a loving relationship with his two gay dads. After his powers manifest, he is able to become a green humanoid hybrid version of animals he encounters. S.T.A.R. Labs gives him the codename Changeling. 
 Tara Markov / Terra: Tara Markov is a troubled, short-tempered girl with the ability to control the earth around her. She's in a relationship with Vic. S.T.A.R. Labs gives her the codename Terra.
 Joseph "Joey" Wilson / Jericho: Joey Wilson is another member of Project Titans with the ability to jump from body to body. He is incredibly gifted and finds highschool boring with his father remarking he's acting similarly to elitists. It is revealed that Dr. Stone manipulated him with hypnosis. During a struggle with his father, his throat is accidentally sliced and is forced to jump into Slade's body. Having jumped between bodies, he is currently stuck inside Blackfire. S.T.A.R. Labs gives him the codename Jericho. 
 Tempest: Tempest is among those who were experimented on by S.T.A.R. Labs. Unlike the others, he was raised in captivity, due to his fish-like appearance. He was brought along by the others when they ran away. He doesn't speak, and only has basic understandings of situations. He was given the ability of hydrokinesis, and can breathe underwater, but he can only survive on land for short periods without special equipment.
 Koriand'r / Starfire: Koriand'r is an alien refugee whose family escaped from an invading force. She is found by S.T.A.R. labs as an infant. Her DNA was grafted into the other Titans while they were infants. The children's powers manifested because she went through puberty. She speaks in a very childlike manner. She reveals to Raven that she is still being hunted down by the invaders. S.T.A.R. Labs gives her the codename Starfire.
 Raven: Raven, whose real name is never revealed, doesn't physically appear before the others. She lives on an Indian reservation with her grandfather in New Mexico, who helps her discover her powers. She experiences dreams involving the Titans, which push her to help them. After officially meeting the group, she lets them live with her and her grandfather in New Mexico.
 Slade Wilson / Deathstroke: Slade Wilson is Joey's father, and a S.T.A.R. Labs enforcer. His strength comes from a battle armor he wears.
 Elinore Stone: Elinore Stone is Victor's foster mother. She is among the people who worked on the projects Titans, Starfire, and Blackfire. She only cares for the results of the mission and nothing more, going as far as willing to kill any member of S.T.A.R. Labs to do so.
 Rita Markov: Rita Markov is Tara's foster mother. She takes on the appearance of a drunken woman. Her husband tried to back off the project, only to be killed years ago.
 Steve Dayton: Steve Dayton is Gar's foster father. Even though originally only dedicated to the project, he's developed a liking to Gar, actually considering him to be his son.

Introduced in Volume Two
 Niles Caulder: Niles Caulder is the head of projects Titans, Starfire, and Blackfire. He can barely move and uses an exoskeleton if he needs to get up. He intends to bring down the US government using the Titans.
 Wally West / Impulse: Wally West is a member of Niles Caulder's Titans who possesses the ability of super speed. Growing up inside a S.T.A.R. Labs facility, he only knows of the outside world from Caulder, whom he considers his father. Because of this, he views the outside world as dirty and is in need of a new start. After finding out Niles lied to him, he joins the team. S.T.A.R. Labs gives him the codename Impulse.
 Kole Weathers: Kole Weathers is a member of Niles Caulder's Titans with the ability to create crystals. Growing up inside a S.T.A.R. Labs facility, she only knows of the outside world from Caulder, whom she considers her father. However, meeting with the children seems to have changed her mind, and she helps them escape.
 Cassie Sandsmark / Wonder Girl: Cassie Sandsmark is a member of Niles Caulder's Titans who has superhuman strength and invulnerability. Growing up inside a S.T.A.R. Labs facility, she only knows of the outside world from Caulder who she considers her father. She is the youngest among the members. S.T.A.R. Labs gives her the codename Wonder Girl.
 Joshua Clay: Joshua Clay is the chief scientist at S.T.A.R. Labs.
 Blackfire: Blackfire is a failed clone of Starfire created by Caulder. She is incredibly violent and is very childlike. Jericho has currently possessed her and is uses her body to escape with Caulder.

Wonder Woman: Earth One

Introduced in Volume One
 Princess Diana / Wonder Woman: Diana is the princess of the Amazons and the daughter of Hippolyta and Hercules, conceived out of wedlock when Hercules raped Hippolyta. Diana is loved by her sisters, but feels different from the others when she's unable to participate in many Amazon traditions due to her unique powers inherited from her demigod father. Nevertheless, Diana has an individual drive, one that leads her to save Steve Trevor despite becoming a criminal on Paradise Island.
 Queen Hippolyta: Hippolyta is the Queen of the Amazons and mother to Diana. This version is similar to her mainstream counterpart, but is depicted as less honest and more rough to her daughter. She wants protect Amazons from man's world, even willing to use a brute force if necessary. She hides a secret from the others where Diana discovers it during her trial.
 Steve Trevor: Steve Trevor is an air force pilot who crash lands on Paradise Island and is saved by Diana. Unlike his DC Universe counterpart, this Steve Trevor is portrayed as an African-American man, a change made by writer Grant Morrison because he wanted more diversity in the comic, as well as finding it a "more potent idea to have Steve Trevor as a Black man. It's much more powerful in the context of everything that Marston was doing and everything that Wonder Woman is about."
 Beth Candy: Beth Candy is a sorority girl and Diana's first friend in "man's world". Grant Morrison altered Etta Candy's name to honor singer Beth Ditto, while also incorporating elements of Rebel Wilson into the character.
 Nubia: Nubia serves as Queen Hippolyta's closest advisor and second-in-command of the Amazons. She also shares in a romantic relationship with her queen. Her role is similar to General Philippus in the main DC Universe.
 Mala: Mala is Diana's former lover and champion of the Amazons. Mala commanded the Swan Plane until Diana challenged her to a duel, eventually beating her lover and taking her plane from her. She despised Steve Trevor as she believed he took Diana from her.
 Althea: Althea is chief doctor among the Amazons. Althea is keeper of the Purple Healing Ray, though it is eventually stolen by Diana to use on Steve Trevor. Althea testified in Diana's case.
 Troia: Troia is one of the Amazons who attempted to bring Diana back to Paradise Island.
 Artemis: Artemis is another of the Amazons who attempted to bring Diana back to Paradise Island.
 The Fates: The three sisters of fate: Clotho, Lachesis, and Atropos. They were witnesses at Diana's trial.
 Aphrodite: Aphrodite is the patron Goddess of the Amazons. She aided Hippolyta by revealing that retrieving her girdle would restore her power and allow her to slay Hercules.
 Hercules: Hercules is a massive warrior and a demigod son of Zeus endowed with godly strength who had captured Hippolyta and the Amazons and stolen the queen's girdle. He is Diana's father, whom he inadvertently sired when he raped Hippolyta, and it is from him that she inherits her divine powers.
 Medusa: Medusa is the menacing gorgon who serves as a weapon for the Amazons. Hippolyta traveled to the Underworld to recruit Medusa's aid in returning her daughter back to Paradise Island for her trial. This led to Medusa turning Steve Trevor and several others into stone.
 General Darnell: General Darnell is Steve Trevor's superior in the air force. He and two others questioned Steve when he was returned to the United States by Diana.

Introduced in Volume Two
 Baroness Paula von Gunther: Paula von Gunther, also known as Uberfraulein, is a high-ranking Nazi agent that attempted to conquer Paradise Island for Germany. After battling Queen Hippolyta, Paula was forced into submission and became an Amazon herself. She first appears in the second volume of the series.
 Leon Zeiko / Doctor Psycho: Leon Zeiko is a pickup artist whose skills in the field of hypnosis and neurolinguistics were required by the US Army.
 Maxwell Lord: Maxwell Lord is an expert entrepreneur who provides his services to the US Army in areas such as robotics and psychology. Revealed to be this world's version of Ares.

Introduced in Volume Three
 General Conquest, Dr. Duke and Mr. Earl: Maxwell Lord/ Ares' loyal servants.
 Professor Garrett Manly:

Green Lantern: Earth One

Introduced in Volume One
 Hal Jordan / Green Lantern: Hal Jordan is a former astronaut who worked on a joint project between NASA and Monarcha Energy to build Arrowhead, an orbital platform which was intended to be used for deep space exploration, but which Jordan discovered was in fact a space weapon. It is implied that Arrowhead was used in a coup which ushered in an authoritarian regime. Feeling responsible for not speaking up, and disillusioned with humanity, Hal took a job as an asteroid miner with Ferris Galactic in an attempt to leave Earth. Jordan stumbles across one of the few remaining power rings in the galaxy, as the Green Lantern Corps was wiped out by the Manhunters generations ago. Thrust into the wider galaxy, Jordan teams up with Kilowog, a ring-bearer and the descendant of a Green Lantern, and begins searching for allies against the Manhunters. After repeatedly failing to enlist the aid of the few remaining ring-bearers, Jordan is eventually captured while his ring is drained and enslaved by the Manhunters on a planet that is revealed to be Oa. He discovers the presumed destroyed Central Power Battery, and is able to rally the bearers of all surviving power rings to join him in rescuing the Battery and freeing the slaves. With the Battery restored and the power rings' full powers unlocked, the Green Lantern Corps is revived under the leadership of Arisia. Hal returns to Earth and reveals his identity as a Green Lantern to his Captain, Amy Seaton.
 Kilowog: A scientist living on Bolovax Vik, one of the few independent planets left in explored space, at the fringes of the Manhunter's sphere of influence. He is the latest in a long line of self-proclaimed Green Lanterns and protectors of Bolovax, he wears a homemade uniform and carries a power ring and battery passed down through the centuries following the destruction of the Corps. When Hal Jordan crashlands on Bolovax, Kilowog treats his wounds and gives him some basic lessons in the history of the Green Lanterns and the use of his power ring. The Homeguard, the military of Bolovax, attempt to arrest and destroy Jordan for fear that he will bring the Manhunters to their world, but the point is rendered moot when the Manhunters attack anyway. The two pseudo-Lanterns are unable to beat the Manhunter invasion force, and Jordan escapes with an unconscious Kilowog, and the two of them decide to seek out the few remaining ring bearers in the galaxy to help fight off the assault on Bolovax. After multiple failed attempts, the two are separated when Jordan is captured by a Manhunter slave ship and taken to Oa. Kilowog is the first to respond to Jordan's distress call, and joins him in nominating Arisia for leader of the new Green Lantern Corps. After the Central Power Battery is liberated, Kilowog and Jordan successfully fight of the stragglers of the Manhunter force on Bolovax.
 Arisia Rrab: The descendant of a long-dead Green Lantern also named Arisia, and the inheritor of her ancestor's Power Ring. She is the leader of a rebel group against the Manhunters hiding out on a distant world. Hal Jordan and Kilowog track her down seeking help in fighting off the Manhunters attacking Kilowog's homeworld, but she refuses. However, she later responds to Jordan's distress call and participates in the recovery of the Central Power Battery, and leads the Lanterns in rescuing the slaves in the mines on Oa. Following the battle, she is elected the leader of the revitalised Green Lantern Corps.
 Manhunters: Hundreds of years prior to the events depicted in Green Lantern: Earth One, the Manhunters wiped out the majority of the Green Lantern Corps and captured the Central Power Battery, which was assumed destroyed. In a reverse of most versions of their origin story, the Manhunters were created by the Guardians of Oa to replace the Corps, who they felt had become too independent. The Manhunters however turned on the Guardians, killing all but a single survivor who fled to an alternate dimension. The Manhunters carved out an empire in the space previously patrolled by the Green Lanterns, centred on Oa. Hal Jordan, an asteroid miner who had stumbled onto a Power Ring was captured and taken to Oa, which the Manhunters had converted into a mine. Jordan was able to find the Central Battery and summon the remaining Ring bearers to Oa. By creating a controlled feedback loop between the Central Battery and their Rings, the Lanterns were able to destroy the majority of the Manhunters, although the surviving Manhunters still pose a significant threat.
 Guardians of the Universe: The Guardians founded the Green Lantern Corps as a galactic peacekeeping force thousands of years ago. However, feeling that the Green Lanterns had become too wilful and independent, they created the robotic Manhunters as a replacement. The Manhunters decimated the Corps as planned, but then turned on the Guardians, apparently killing all but one. The last Guardian fled to an alternate dimension, and began work on a third force to replace the Manhunters. Hundreds of years later, pseudo-Lantern Hal Jordan rediscovered the lost Central Power Battery on Oa, now a mining planet at the heart of the Manhunter's empire. The Guardian contacted Jordan through the Battery and, after telling a slightly distorted version of the history of the Guardians, Corps and Manhunters, instructed him to summon the last remaining ringbearers to Oa and create a feedback loop between their power rings and the Battery, thereby destroying the Lanterns and the Manhunters, allowing the Guardian to return with all threats to his power removed. One of the ringbearers was a physicist who was able to devise a way to control the feedback loop. Therefore, the Lanterns survived the explosion and came together as a united force again, much to the Guardian's annoyance.
 Sinestro
 Tomar-Re
 Amy Seaton
 Salakk

Introduced in Volume Two
 John Stewart
 Carol Ferris
 Ngendo Muturi
 Sophie Rivas
Thomas Kalmaku

See also
 Lists of DC Comics characters

References

External links
 Earth One Characters

Earth One (DC graphic novel series)
Earth One